Tanlajás is a town and municipality in San Luis Potosí in central Mexico.

References

Municipalities of San Luis Potosí